John McDougald  (March 13, 1848 – June 14, 1919) was a merchant and political figure in Nova Scotia, Canada. He represented Pictou in the House of Commons of Canada from 1881 to 1896 as a Liberal-Conservative member.

Biography 
He was born in Blue Mountain, Pictou County, Nova Scotia, the son of Dougald McDougald and Elizabeth Fraser, of Scottish descent. He was educated at New Glasgow and established himself as a merchant in Westville. McDougald was named a justice of the peace in 1879 and served as a member of the first municipal council for Pictou County in 1879, being reelected in 1880, 1882 and 1884. He was first elected to the House of Commons in an 1881 by-election held after James McDonald was named Chief Justice of the Supreme Court of Nova Scotia. In 1882, he married Maggie J. McLeod. McDougald was named Commissioner of Customs in 1896. He was named to the Order of St. Michael and St. George in 1912. McDougald died in Halifax at the age of 71.

electoral history

References 

 
The Canadian parliamentary companion, 1887 Gemmill, JA

1848 births
1919 deaths
Conservative Party of Canada (1867–1942) MPs
Members of the House of Commons of Canada from Nova Scotia
Canadian Companions of the Order of St Michael and St George
Canadian justices of the peace